The Montgomery 23 is an American trailerable sailboat that was designed by Lyle Hess as a cruiser and first built in 1979.

The Montgomery 23 is often confused with the Montgomery 23 Offshore Cutter, a development of this design by a different boat builder.

Production
The design was built by Montgomery Marine Products in the United States starting in 1979, with 20 boats completed, but it is now out of production. Boats were sold complete and ready-to-sail or as kits, with the interior left for amateur completion.

Design
The Montgomery 23 is a recreational keelboat, built predominantly of fiberglass, with wood trim. The hull is molded with simulated wooden lapstrake construction, to make it look like a wooden boat. It has a masthead sloop rig, a nearly-plumb stem, a slightly angled transom, a transom-hung rudder controlled by a tiller and a fixed stub keel with a swing keel. It displaces  and carries  of ballast.

The boat is normally fitted with a small  outboard motor for docking and maneuvering.

The design has sleeping accommodation for four people, with a double "V"-berth in the bow cabin and two straight settee berths in the main cabin. The galley is located on the starboard side at the companionway ladder. The galley is "L"-shaped and is equipped with a two-burner stove and a sink. The head is located just aft of the bow cabin on the port side.

Operational history
In a 2010 review Steve Henkel wrote, "This is an unusual fiberglass boat, partly because her hull is
lapstraked (that is, simulated overlapping planks are molded right into the hull), and partly because she has one of the tallest rigs (33' 6" bridge clearance) of all the 23-footers ... The M23 was available either factory-finished or sold without the usual fiberglass interior liner for finishing by owner. If you're buying one of these boats used, check the finish to see if it is up to the factory standard (which was fairly high), or was homebuilt ... Best features: The boat looks admirably 'shippy.' Worst features: Her trailering weight of 5,400 pounds means a hefty truck is needed to tow her."

See also
List of sailing boat types

References

External links
Photo of a Montgomery 23 showing the simulated lapstrake construction

Keelboats
1970s sailboat type designs
Sailing yachts
Trailer sailers
Sailboat type designs by Lyle Hess
Sailboat types built by Montgomery Marine Products